Carolyn D. Laine (born May 22, 1946) is a Minnesota politician and former member of the Minnesota Senate. A member of the Minnesota Democratic–Farmer–Labor Party (DFL), she represented District 41 in the north-central Twin Cities metropolitan area. She also previously represented District 41B in the Minnesota House of Representatives.

Early life, education, and career
Laine attended Hibbing Junior College in Hibbing, then went on to the University of Minnesota in Duluth, receiving her B.S. in Education and Psychology. She later earned her M.A. in Psychology from St. Mary's University, based in Winona. She has done doctoral graduate work in Health Psychology through Saybrook Graduate School and Research Center, based in San Francisco, California.

Laine has worked as a reserve teacher for the Minneapolis Public School System, and as a financial director for the Novalis Institute in Columbia Heights. She served on the Columbia Heights School Board for ten years, and was also a member of the Columbia Heights Charter Commission. She is a former leader of the Parent Communication Network, and a member of the Interfaith Alliance.

Minnesota Legislature
Laine was first elected to the Minnesota House of Representatives in 2006, opting to run after three-term Rep. Barb Goodwin decided not to seek re-election, and was re-elected in 2008, 2010, 2012, and 2014. She was elected to the Minnesota Senate in 2016.

References

External links

 Official Minnesota Senate website
 Official campaign website
 Project Votesmart – Rep. Carolyn Laine Profile
 Minnesota Public Radio Votetracker: Rep. Carolyn Laine

1946 births
Living people
People from Columbia Heights, Minnesota
Democratic Party members of the Minnesota House of Representatives
Women state legislators in Minnesota
21st-century American politicians
21st-century American women politicians
Democratic Party Minnesota state senators